Underrail is a 2015 role-playing video game by Stygian Software for Windows. It was first released in early access in late 2012. An expansion pack, Underrail: Expedition, was released in 2019 while a sequel, Underrail: Infusion, is under development.

Gameplay
Underrail is a post-apocalyptic role-playing game focused on combat and exploration. It features turn-based combat, character customization, and an item crafting system. The player controls a single character, whose development and interactions with the game world are the focus of the gameplay. The game's ruleset is mainly inspired by the SPECIAL system from the Fallout series. It is a classless system with multiple levels of customization. Base ability scores determine a character's core potential, skills represent a character's linear progression in specific skills and feats can grant new abilities, provide passive bonuses or alter a character's existing abilities. The turn-based combat system is similar to Fallout's with more options added on top of it, such as the use of special abilities, psionics and more combat utilities. The system is intended to provide many combat options and unique playstyles.

Plot

Setting
The game is set in the far future when the Earth's surface has been uninhabitable for a long time and the remaining humans live in the eponymous Underrail metro network, where conflicting factions struggle violently to survive in the harsh underground conditions. The scarcest resources in Underrail are food and living space. There is also a greater background plot concerning the nature of time, but the game is mostly about the inhabitants of Underrail, their politics, strife and the dangers of Underrail itself.

Story
The player takes on the role of a new member of one of the stations on the fringe of Underrail. The player character starts as a blank slate, allowing the player to develop him or her as preferred. The story is narrated primarily through dialogue with non-player characters inhabiting the world of Underrail. The player is positioned to side with different competing factions in their battle to annex stations.

Development
Game engine development for Underrail began in late 2008.
The game's custom engine and development tools are built using C#, Microsoft's .NET 4.0 framework and XNA Game Studio 4.0. The game has been in full-time development since late 2009 and it was known as Timelapse Vertigo during its pre-alpha and earlier development stages. Prior to its early access release on Windows, most of the development work including design, programming, writing and graphics excluding character models and title screen, was done by Dejan Radisic. Since its initial demo version release in 2012, updated versions of Underrail were released roughly every three or four months.

The game was crowdfunded with early access sales providing additional funding. Character models and music of the game were created by freelance artists and while royalty-free sound effects were used. The first trailer for Underrail was released on March 11, 2013, showcasing alpha version gameplay footage.

Release
On August 22, 2012, a demo of Underrail was released on IndieDB. On December 6, 2012, an alpha version became available on both Desura and GamersGate digital distribution platforms, and on September 24, 2013, alpha version became available as early access on the Steam store as well.

The game was released out of early access on December 18, 2015. An expansion, Underrail: Expedition, was released on July 22, 2019, and features a new plotline based in new locations, alongside other gameplay changes and additions. A sequel, Underrail: Infusion, is under development.

References

External links

2015 video games
Indie video games
Microsoft XNA games
Post-apocalyptic video games
Role-playing video games
Science fiction video games
Single-player video games
Steam Greenlight games
Video games with isometric graphics
Video games developed in Serbia
Video games featuring protagonists of selectable gender
Windows games
Windows-only games
Early access video games
Video games with expansion packs